

211001–211100 

|-id=021
| 211021 Johnpercin ||  || John Percin Jr. (1989–2013), one of the 19 elite Prescott's Granite Mountain Hotshot  firefighters who died battling a blaze on a ridge in Yarnell, Arizona, United States || 
|}

211101–211200 

|-id=172
| 211172 Tarantola ||  || Albert Tarantola (1949–2009) was a visionary geophysicist who made seminal contributions to Inverse Problem Theory. He was the first to use inversion methods to image the Earth's interior using seismic waveforms. || 
|}

211201–211300 

|-bgcolor=#f2f2f2
| colspan=4 align=center | 
|}

211301–211400 

|-id=343
| 211343 Dieterhusar ||  || Dieter Husar (born 1947), a German physicist and amateur astronomer || 
|-id=374
| 211374 Anthonyrose ||  || Anthony Rose (1990–2013), one of the 19 Granite Mountain Hotshots who died fighting the 2013 Yarnell Hill Fire in Arizona || 
|-id=375
| 211375 Jessesteed ||  || Jesse Steed (1977–2013), one of the 19 Granite Mountain Hotshots who died fighting the 2013 Yarnell Hill Fire in Arizona || 
|-id=376
| 211376 Joethurston ||  || Joe Thurston (1981–2013), one of the 19 Granite Mountain Hotshots who died fighting the 2013 Yarnell Hill Fire in Arizona || 
|-id=377
| 211377 Travisturbyfill ||  || Travis Turbyfill (1986–2013), one of the 19 Granite Mountain Hotshots who died fighting the 2013 Yarnell Hill Fire in Arizona || 
|-id=378
| 211378 Williamwarneke ||  || William Warneke (1988–2013), one of the 19 Granite Mountain Hotshots who died fighting the 2013 Yarnell Hill Fire in Arizona || 
|-id=379
| 211379 Claytonwhitted ||  || Clayton Whitted (1985–2013), one of the 19 Granite Mountain Hotshots who died fighting the 2013 Yarnell Hill Fire in Arizona || 
|-id=380
| 211380 Kevinwoyjeck ||  || Kevin Woyjeck (1992–2013), one of the 19 Granite Mountain Hotshots who died fighting the 2013 Yarnell Hill Fire in Arizona || 
|-id=381
| 211381 Garretzuppiger ||  || Garret Zuppiger (1986–2013), one of the 19 Granite Mountain Hotshots who died fighting the 2013 Yarnell Hill Fire in Arizona || 
|}

211401–211500 

|-id=473
| 211473 Herin ||  || Thierry Herin (born 1966), a French amateur astronomer || 
|}

211501–211600 

|-bgcolor=#f2f2f2
| colspan=4 align=center | 
|}

211601–211700 

|-id=613
| 211613 Christophelovis ||  || Christophe Lovis (born 1977), Swiss astrophysicist and member of the extrasolar planet group at Geneva University. He co-discovered three Neptune-sized exoplanets – HD 69830 b, HD 69830 c, and HD 69830 d – around the star HD 69830. || 
|}

211701–211800 

|-bgcolor=#f2f2f2
| colspan=4 align=center | 
|}

211801–211900 

|-bgcolor=#f2f2f2
| colspan=4 align=center | 
|}

211901–212000 

|-bgcolor=#f2f2f2
| colspan=4 align=center | 
|}

References 

211001-212000